The Men's time trial H3 road cycling event at the 2012 Summer Paralympics took place on September 5 at Brands Hatch. Ten riders from eight nations competed. The race distance was 16 km.

Results

References

Men's road time trial H3